Tingkhong is a town of Dibrugarh district of Assam state in northeast India. Administratively Tingkhong is located within Dibrugarh district and is today an important tea cultivation and oil exploration area of Assam. Tingkhong is approximately 80 km from Dibrugarh by road towards south-east and approximately 70 km from Tinsukia (locally pronounced as Tinicukeeya) towards south. The nearest airport is Dibrugarh located at a distance of approximately 70 km and nearest small railway station is at Naharkatia town. Urban areas close to Tingkhong are Naharkatiya - 20 km, Duliajan - 33 km, Sonari - 18 km, Moran - 37 km, etc. by roadways.

History 
It is said that Suhungmung built the town of Tingkhong, settled a number of Ahom princes. Henceforth it became the residence of the Tungkhungia ahom princes. Gadadhar Singha had famously built here the Rahdoi pukhuri here.

Geography
It has an average elevation of 116 metres (381 feet).

Transport
The Naharkatia Railway station serves as the railhead which is 20 km apart. Buses play frequently to and from  Naharkatia, Moran, Rajgarh, etc. And direct bus facility to district centre Dibrugarh .

Economy
Most of the people of Tingkhong are depend on farming of paddy and tea. There are numerous tea gardens in this constituency. Approximately every household have their own small tea gardens.

Culture
Bihu The major indigenous  festival of Assam, during this season Bihu dance competition is held in Langharjan stadium. It is a week-long celebration for all the youngsters in the region.

Education
Primary & Secondary Schools: 
There are several schools for primary education in the whole constituency. Out of them Tingkhong Model Academy and Tingkhong Jatia Vidyalaya are known by all.

Higher Education: 
Tingkhong College is the only institution of Higher Education. It offers bachelor's degree in Arts.

Members of Legislative Assembly
The town is also a constituency in the Assam Legislative Assembly.
1978: Bhadeswar Gogoi, Janata Party
1985: Atul Chandra Koch, Independent Candidate
1991: Pritibi Majhi, Indian National Congress
1996: Atuwa Munda, Indian National Congress
2001: Atuwa Munda, Indian National Congress
2006: Anup Phunkan, Asom Gana Parishad
2011: Atuwa Munda, Indian National Congress
2016: Bimal Borah, Bhartiya Janata Party
2021: Bimal Borah, [[Bhartiya
Janata party]]

References

External links 
 The District of Dibrugarh
 The government of Assam
 List of constituencies of Assam Legislative Assembly
 Tingkhong College
 Tingkhong Model Academy

Cities and towns in Dibrugarh district
Ahom kingdom